The Roy Harper House is a historic house in rural western White County, Arkansas. It is a single-story wood box-frame structure, with a gable roof and a stone pier foundation. It has a porch extending across the front, noted for its turned posts and brackets. The house was built c. 1912, and is one of few surviving buildings in the county from this period to use box-frame construction.

The house was listed on the National Register of Historic Places in 1992.

See also
National Register of Historic Places listings in White County, Arkansas

References

Houses on the National Register of Historic Places in Arkansas
Houses completed in 1912
1912 establishments in Arkansas
National Register of Historic Places in White County, Arkansas